National Route 262 is a national highway of Japan connecting Hagi, Yamaguchi and Hōfu, Yamaguchi in Japan, with a total length of 57.2 km (35.54 mi).

References

National highways in Japan
Roads in Yamaguchi Prefecture